Artery may refer to:

 Artery, a blood vessel in the body that carries blood away from the heart
 Artery (band), a post-punk band from Sheffield, England, formed in 1978
 Artery (character), a character in the Demonata book series by Darren Shan
 Arterial road, moderate or high-capacity road which is just below a highway level of service
 Central Artery, a freeway in Boston, Massachusetts
 Arteria, a synonym for a genus of mantises, Aethalochroa

See also
 
 
 Arter